The ReVe Festival 2022 – Feel My Rhythm is the fifth special extended play and  by South Korean girl group Red Velvet, released by SM Entertainment on March 21, 2022, to commemorate the birthday of German Baroque music composer J.S. Bach. It contains six tracks, including the lead single "Feel My Rhythm", in three physical versions, two "ReVe" versions with different covers and the "Orgel" version.

Background and release
Red Velvet first hinted they would be making a comeback at SM Entertainment's New Year's concert, SM Town Live 2022. On February 18, 2022, an official from their label revealed that the group was preparing an album and aiming for a March release. Before the group's comeback, they were initially scheduled to hold a special live concert called 2022 The ReVe Festival: Prologue at the SK Handball Stadium in Seoul Olympic Park from March 19–20; however, the event was postponed when members Irene, Joy, and Yeri tested positive for COVID-19 on March 14. The EP's title is a continuation of and sequel to the group's music festival concept, The ReVe Festival, after which they named three releases in 2019. "ReVe" takes its name from Red Velvet and the word for "dream" and "fantasy" in French.

On March 2, the title of the group's EP, The ReVe Festival 2022 – Feel My Rhythm, was announced. Its physical release comes in two "ReVe" versions of different designs and the "Orgel" version. The EP features six songs in a variety of genres, including lead single "Feel My Rhythm". By March 7, a schedule poster was released through the group's various social media accounts, containing a variety of content release schedules related to the EP. Starting on March 8, teaser images of the group were sequentially released. The EP itself was released on March 21.

Composition
"Feel My Rhythm" is a dance-pop song incorporating "intense trap beats" and "string-like melodies", including a sample of the Bach arrangement "Air on the G String". The lyrics vividly unravel the journey to enjoy freely through time and space along with the song. "Rainbow Halo" is an R&B and dance-pop song featuring "restrained" clap sounds and a "subtle" bell sound over a "groovy" bass along with Red Velvet's "languid" and "dreamy" vocals. "Beg for Me" is another R&B and dance-pop song with "chic" vocals.

"Bamboleo" is a retro city pop song with a "rhythmic" bass and electronic guitar combined with "dreamy" synth sounds. Like the title, which means "shaking" in Spanish, the lyrics talk about dancing all night. "Good, Bad, Ugly" is a mid-tempo R&B song including a rhythmic brass sound over a "groovy" shuffle rhythm and a "sensuous" chord progression. The lyrics liken life's unpredictable moments to "choosing one of the numerous chocolates in a box". "In My Dreams" is a slow R&B ballad with "minimal trap rhythms" and the sound of a music box at the beginning and end. The lyrics express a desire to be together with the person you love forever, even in dreams.

Critical reception

Upon its release, The ReVe Festival 2022 – Feel My Rhythm received positive reviews from music critics.

Zhenzhen Yu writing for Pitchfork called the EP "refined, verdant dance-pop better suited for springtime". She further added that the title track is "one of Red Velvet’s finest title tracks", reminiscent of the elegant darkness of their 2019 hit “Psycho”. Overall, she stated the EP "stirs awake from complacency and reinstates the group’s regality without compromising their principles." and gave it a score of 7.4 out of 10.

Commercial performance
By March 20, 2022, it was reported that The ReVe Festival 2022 – Feel My Rhythm accumulated 516,866 total pre-orders, a career high for Red Velvet, making them a half-million seller. 

The EP debuted at number two on the Gaon Weekly Album Chart in the chart issue dated March 20–26, 2022, before peaking at number one in the chart issue dated April 10-16, 2022, become the group's twelfth number-one album, expand the record for the group as the girl group with the most number-one albums on the chart.
As of April 2022, the EP sold 653,610 copies on the Gaon Chart, making the EP the group's best-selling physical release of their career. It is also being certified by Gaon Chart at Double Platinum for selling over 500,000 copies.

Accolades

Track listing

Notes

 "Feel My Rhythm" samples the Johann Sebastian Bach arrangement "Air on the G String".
 "Bamboleo" is stylized in all caps.

Charts

Weekly charts

Monthly charts

Year-end charts

Certifications and sales

Release history

See also
 The ReVe Festival: Day 1
 The ReVe Festival: Day 2
 The ReVe Festival: Finale

References

2022 EPs
Red Velvet (group) EPs
SM Entertainment EPs
Korean-language EPs